The Mineral Water Bowl is an annual American NCAA Division II college football bowl game between a team from the Northern Sun Intercollegiate Conference and an at large opponent hosted in Excelsior Springs, Missouri at Tiger Stadium. It is one of four NCAA Division II sanctioned bowl games; the others are the Live United Texarkana Bowl, the Heritage Bowl, and the America's Crossroads Bowl. The game has been on hiatus since the 2019 contest.

History

From 1948 to 1951, the Mineral Water Bowl was a high school bowl game to showcase the Excelsior Springs High School team against another Missouri high school squad in the school's Thanksgiving contest. The Missouri High School Athletic Association never officially sanctioned the contest and forbade Excelsior Springs from playing in the game after 1950. (It remains unclear why Excelsior Springs was singled out while the association continued to sanction other Thanksgiving football games in the state, such as Kirkwood vs. Webster Groves, still played to this day). After the 1951 contest featuring two opponents from outside the area, the high school Mineral Water Bowl was no more.  

In 1954, the bowl was revived as a small-college game. As of 1957, it was one of 11 NCAA sanctioned bowl games. The small-college contest continued annually until 1975, when declining interest led to the game being discontinued for a second time.  

In 1992 the bowl was revived as a National Junior College Athletic Association postseason game, but after eight seasons, it became an NCAA bowl game once again, this time for teams from Division II.

From 2000 through 2017, representatives from the Mid-America Intercollegiate Athletics Association (MIAA) and Northern Sun Intercollegiate Conference (NSIC) were chosen yearly for the game, with invitations going to the top-placing team in each conference not receiving a bid to the NCAA Division II National Football Championship playoffs. This arrangement was eventually strained when the MIAA began to send its top non-playoff teams to four other Division II bowl games: the now-defunct Kanza Bowl (from 2009 through 2012) and C.H.A.M.P.S. Heart of Texas Bowl (in 2016 and 2017), along with the Live United Texarkana Bowl (in 2014, 2015, and 2017) and Heritage Bowl (in 2017).

The 2018 game featured teams from the NSIC and the Great Lakes Valley Conference. The 2019 game once again included representatives from the NSIC and MIAA, the latter chosen as an at-large team.

Both the 2020 and 2021 editions of the Mineral Water Bowl were cancelled due to the COVID-19 pandemic.

All-time scores

High school

Small college

Junior college

NCAA Division II

Appearances by team
This list is for appearances in the Mineral Water Bowl since the 2000 edition, when the bowl became a postseason NCAA Division II game.

References

External links
 

College football bowls
Bowl
Mid-America Intercollegiate Athletics Association football
American football in Missouri